The Pakistan Naval Air Arm (unofficially: Pakistan Naval Aviation) is the naval aviation branch within the Pakistan Navy that is responsible for aerial operations from the seaborne platform.

The naval aviation branch is responsible for conducting the land-based strike capability, fleet air defence, evacuation and extraction, search and rescue, maritime reconnaissance, and anti-submarine warfare. Early in its inception the Naval Air Arm was dependent upon the Air Force and the Army to meet its training requirement of air and ground crew.

The Commander Naval Aviation (COMNAV) command is usually held by a senior officer of Commodore rank who directs the field operations of the naval aviation.

History

Establishment

After the second war with India in 1965, the concept of establishing the navy-based aviation service was conceived by the Pakistan Navy who forwarded the idea to the Government of Pakistan as part of the war strategy to sustain the purely defence of nation's maritime interests.

The Navy had been long aware of the usefulness and tactical advantages of the air-wing after witnessing the United States Naval Aviators' actions in the Vietnam War, and V-Adm. Muzaffar Hassan, the Navy Commander, had made attempts to establish naval aviation but this was impossible to achieve in the absence of generous support from outside sources.

Furthermore, strong objections came from Air Marshal Abdur Rahim Khan, the Air Commander, who had been very hostile towards any idea of modernizing the navy and loath to risk its precious aircraft in over-the-water operations. The lack of funds and donations from the United States Navy meant the concept never materialized though the Navy entered into talks with the United States Government to effect the transferring of three to four Lockheed P-3 Orion aircraft before the third war with India in 1971.

After the first missile attack in Karachi in 1971, the Navy hastily established the naval air arm by leasing a civilian aircraft, the Fokker F27, from the Pakistan International Airlines whose pilots volunteered to carry the naval observers on a maritime reconnaissance on 6 December 1971. Cdre. A. W. Bhomba, the senior forward observer, mistakenly identified his own ship,  forming defences at that time, and gave clearance to the Pakistan Air Force to carry out a bombing mission to target the ship – a friendly fire incident that further hampered Navy's operational scope.

After the third war with India in 1971, the Air Arm continued and was able to induct Sea King helicopters from the United Kingdom through transfers from the Royal Navy on 28 September 1974– leading to the establishment of the 111 ASW Squadron in the Naval Aviation. The first naval air station, PNS Mehran, was inaugurated in Karachi, in the vicinity of the Faisal Air Force Base, on 26 September 1975.

Atlantique Incident 

The Atlantique Incident was a major international incident that occurred on 10 August 1999 when a Pakistan Naval Air Arm patrol aircraft—a Breguet Atlantique with 16 personnel on board—was shot down in the border area of the Kutch region by Indian Air Force jets. Pakistan and India both claimed the aircraft to be in their respective airspace.

Some experts stated that the Atlantique was probably conducting a "probe" on India's air defence system, mainly the radar equipment in the border area; however, they advised that it was not part of any planned aggressive military action by Pakistan. Foreign diplomats who visited the crash site noted that the plane "may have strayed into restricted space", and that Islamabad was unable to explain why it was flying so close to the border; they however added that India's reaction to the incident was not justified. Many countries, the G8, the permanent members of the UN Security Council, as well as the western media questioned the wisdom behind Pakistan's decision to fly military aircraft so close to the Indian border.

On 21 September 1999, Pakistan lodged a compensation claim at the International Court of Justice (ICJ) in The Hague, accusing India of shooting down an unarmed aircraft. Pakistan sought about US$60 million in reparations from India and compensation for the victims' families. India's attorney general, Soli Sorabjee, argued that the court did not have jurisdiction, citing an exemption it filed in 1974 to exclude disputes between India and other Commonwealth States, and disputes covered by multi-lateral treaties.

On 21 June 2000, the 16-judge Bench headed by Gilbert Guillaume of France ruled—with a 14–2 verdict—upholding India's submission that the court had no jurisdiction in this matter. Pakistan's claims were dropped, without recourse to appeal, and the outcome was seen as a decision highly favourable to India. The Pakistan government had spent close to 25 million Pakistani rupees (approx. $400,000) on the case.

PNS Mehran attack
On 22 May 2011, Tehreek-i-Taliban militants attacked the PNS Mehran and killed 18 Navy Personnel and injuring 16. 2 P-3C Orion aircraft were also destroyed in the attack.

Current inventory

Rotary-wing aircraft

The 111 ASW Squadron, which consists of the Sea King, is primarily programmed for missile launch capability targeting dived submarines and releasing depth charges. In 1977, the 333 ASW squadron was established with the induction of the Aérospatiale Alouette II and the Alouette III rotary aircraft, in which the first group of naval aviators were trained in France.

With the acquiring of the s from the Royal Navy, the Navy was additionally able to acquire three Westland Lynx utility helicopters which were inducted into the 222 ASW Squadron.

In 2006, the Navy established the 222 ASW squadron with the introduction of the Harbin Z-9 which is equipped with sensors and radars to support its ESM measures. All Pakistan naval air arm's rotary-wing aircraft are designed for anti-submarine warfare and electronic warfare support measures.

Fixed-wing aircraft

In 1973, the Navy entered into talks with France to acquire the Breguet Atlantic aircraft for its patrolling missions, and acquired the aircraft on 14 August 1976, that established the 29 ASW Atlantic Squadron and is tasked with maritime reconnaissance missions.

In 1982, the 27 ASW Squadron was established with the induction of the Fokker F-27 aircraft, followed by the acquiring of the P-3C Orion aircraft in 1996 after a long delay due to the imposition of the Pressler Amendment in 1990. The P-3C Orion gave the Navy strike capability but one of these planes was lost due to an accident while carrying out routine exercises in local coastal waters on 29 October 1999.

Previously operated 
Previously operated aircraft include the Harbin Y-12, Breguet Atlantic and the Sikorsky UH-19

Squadrons

See also
 Pakistan Air Force
 Pakistan Army Aviation Corps

Notes

External links

 Naval Air Arm
 Pakistan Naval Aviation (Pakistan), Military census

Pakistan Navy
Naval aviation services
Pakistani military aviation